The rainbow water snake (Enhydris enhydris) is a species of mildly venomous, rear-fanged, colubrid snake, endemic to Asia.

Geographic range
E. enhydris is found in southeastern China, Indonesia (Bangka, Belitung, Java, Kalimantan, Sulawesi, Sumatra, We), Bangladesh, Cambodia, central and eastern India, Laos, Malaysia (Malaya and East Malaysia, Borneo, Pulau Tioman), Myanmar (Burma), Nepal, Pakistan, Singapore (?), Sri Lanka, Pulau Bangka, Thailand, and Vietnam.

Type locality: "Indiae orientalis"

References

Further reading
Barbour T. 1912. A Contribution to the Zoögeography of the East Indian Islands. Memoirs Mus. Comp. Zoöl., Harvard College 44 (1): 1-203 + Plates 1–8. (Enhydris enhydris, p. 122).
Boulenger GA. 1890. The Fauna of British India, Including Ceylon and Burma. Reptilia and Batrachia. London: Secretary of State for India in Council.  (Taylor and Francis, printers). xviii + 541 pp. (Hypsirhina enhydris, pp. 376–377).
Boulenger GA. 1896. Catalogue of the Snakes in the British Museum (Natural History). Volume III., Containing the Colubridæ (Opisthoglyphæ and Proteroglyphæ), ... London: Trustees of the British Museum (Natural History). (Taylor and Francis, printers). xiv + 727 pp. + Plates I-XXV. (Hypsirhina enhydris, pp. 6–8).
Cantor T. 1847. Catalogue of the Reptiles Inhabiting the Malayan Peninsula and Islands. J. Asiatic Soc. Bengal [Calcutta] 16 (2): 607–656, 897–952, 1026–1078. (Homalopsis enhydris, pp. 946–948).
Das I. 2002. A Photographic Guide to Snakes and Other Reptiles of India. Sanibel Island, Florida: Ralph Curtis Books. 144 pp. . (Enhydris enhydris, p. 34).
Das I. 2006. A Photographic Guide to Snakes and Other Reptiles of Borneo. Sanibel Island, Florida: Ralph Curtis Books. 144 pp. . (Enhydris enhydris, p. 34).
Duméril A-M-C, Bibron G, Duméril A[-H-A]. 1854. Erpétologie générale ou histoire naturelle complète des reptiles. Tome septième. Deuxième partie. Comprenant l'histoire des serpents venimeux. Paris: Roret. xii + pp. 781–1536. (Hypsirhina enhydris, pp. 946–949).
Günther ACLG. 1864. The Reptiles of British India. London: The Ray Society. (Taylor and Francis, printers). xxviii + 452 pp. + Plates I-XXVI. (Hypsirhina enhydris, pp. 281–282 + Plate XXII, Figure K).
Smith MA. 1943. The Fauna of British India, Ceylon and Burma, Including the Whole of the Indo-Chinese Sub-region. Reptilia and Amphibia. Vol. III.—Serpentes. London: Secretary of State for India. (Taylor and Francis, printers). xii + 583 pp. (Enhydris enhydris, pp. 383–384).
Stuart BL, Smith J, Davey K, Din P, Platt SG. 2000. Homalopsine watersnakes. The harvest and trade from Tonle Sap, Cambodia. Traffic Bull. 18 (3): 115–124.
 Schneider JG. 1799. Historiae Amphibiorum naturalis et literariae Fasciculus Primus continens Ranas, Calamitas, Bufones, Salamandras et Hydros in genera et species descriptos notisque suis distinctos. Jena, Germany: Frommann. xiii + 264 pp. + one plate. (Hydrus enhydris, new species, pp. 245–246).

External links
Homalopsinae.com
Acrochordus.com--Includes Information on Enhydris also 

Enhydris
Snakes of China
Reptiles of India
Snakes of Thailand
Reptiles described in 1799